James M. Brailsford Jr. was an associate justice of the South Carolina Supreme Court. He served in the South Carolina House of Representatives from 1939 to 1942. Then, he was a state trial judge from 1947 to 1962. He was elected to the state Supreme Court in 1962 and served until his retirement in 1974. Justice Brailsford died on November 10, 1993, and is buried at the Sunnyside Cemetery in Orangeburg, South Carolina.

References

Justices of the South Carolina Supreme Court
1910 births
1993 deaths
20th-century American judges